The 1902 East Florida Seminary football team represented the East Florida Seminary in Gainesville, Florida in the sport of American football during the 1902 college football season. 

The season consisted of a two-game series with Stetson, which had fielded one of the first intercollegiate football teams in Florida the previous year. The teams split the games, but the East Florida Seminary claimed a state championship because they scored more points in the series.

Background
The school had been established in 1853 and moved to Gainesville in 1866. 

Football squads from the East Florida Seminary played a limited slate of games starting in 1902 until 1904. In 1905, the school was consolidated along with Florida Agricultural College in Ocala along with two smaller schools to form the modern University of Florida per the Buckman Act. The new institution established its own football program in 1906, and the university does not include games played by its various predecessor institutions in its athletic records.

Schedule
Their known schedule is as follows:

References

East Florida Seminary
East Florida Seminary football seasons
East Florida Seminary football